The 2000 TCU Horned Frogs football team represented Texas Christian University (TCU) in the 2000 NCAA Division I-A football season. The team was led by head coach Dennis Franchione throughout the regular season.  Gary Patterson took over as interim head coach in December. TCU played their home games in Amon G. Carter Stadium, which is located on campus in Fort Worth, Texas. The Horned Frogs finished the 10–2 and 7–1 in conference play to share the Western Athletic Conference championship with UTEP.

Schedule

Roster

Rankings

Game summaries

at Nevada

Awards and honors
LaDainian Tomlinson, Doak Walker Award

Players drafted into the NFL

References

TCU
TCU Horned Frogs football seasons
Western Athletic Conference football champion seasons
TCU Horned Frogs football